Motherbrain is the third studio album by American hard rock band, Crobot. The album was released on August 23, 2019 through Mascot Records, their debut on the label.

Four singles were released in promotion of the album: "Keep Me Down", "Low Life", "Burn", and "Gasoline". "Low Life" reached number 10 on the Billboard Mainstream Rock charts, their highest charting single to date.

Track listing

Personnel
Crobot
 Brandon Yeagley – lead vocals, harmonica
 Chris Bishop – guitars, bass, backing vocals
 Dan Ryan – drums

Additional personnel
 Corey Lowery – producer, mixing, engineering, bass
 Paul Logus – mastering
 Roy Koch – design layout
 Chris Bishop – original album artwork

Charts

References

External links 
 

2019 albums
Crobot albums
Mascot Records albums
Albums produced by Corey Lowery